The Caproni Ca.5 was an Italian heavy bomber of World War I and the postwar era. It was the final version of the series of aircraft that began with the Caproni Ca.1 in 1914.

Development
By late World War I, developments in aircraft technology made older bomber designs unable to penetrate targets defended by modern fighters. Caproni's response to this problem was to significantly uprate the power on the existing Ca.3 design, with some versions of the Ca.5 eventually carrying engines with nearly five times the total power that the first Ca.1 had.

Apart from greater power, various refinements were made to the design, including modifications to the main nacelle and undercarriage, and completely new wings. The first prototype flew in late 1917 and the type remained in production until 1921. Some 659 of all versions were built by Caproni, and another three were licence-built in the US (two Ca.44s by Standard, and one Ca.46 by Fisher). Planned licensed production in France was cancelled with the end of the war.

During the war, Caproni designated these aircraft according to the total power of their engines. Afterwards, the company redesignated them.

Design
The Ca.5 was a three-engine biplane of a wooden construction, covered with fabric. The crew of four was placed in an open central nacelle (front gunner, two pilots and rear gunner-mechanic). The rear gunner manned upper machine guns, standing upon the central engine in a protective "cage", just before a propeller.

Armament consisted of two to four Revelli 6.5 mm or 7.7 mm machine guns, one on a front ring mount and one, two or sometimes even three on an upper ring mount. Bombs were suspended under the hull.

Variants
 Ca.44 - main production version, originally powered by three Fiat A.12 engines of 149 kW (200 hp) each, hence the name Caproni 600 hp. Later, the A-12bis was used, and aircraft so equipped were known as Caproni 600/900 hps
 Ca.45 - variant selected for French service, powered by three Isotta Fraschini V.6s of 186 kW (250 hp) each. (Caproni 600/750 hp, or simply Caproni 750 hp)
 Ca.46 - late-war variant with three 269 kW (360 hp) Liberty engines.
 Ca.47 - (or I.Ca) seaplane version of Ca.44 (ten built)
 Ca.50 - Ca.44s modified as air ambulances
 Ca.57 - (or Breda M-1) - airliner conversion of war-surplus Ca.44s.

Operators

 Corpo Aeronautico Militare

 United States Navy

Specifications (Ca.44)

See also

Bibliography

 

1910s Italian bomber aircraft
Ca.005
Military aircraft of World War I
Three-engined push-pull aircraft
Twin-boom aircraft
Biplanes
Aircraft first flown in 1917